Ellicottville Historic District is a historic district located at Ellicottville in Cattaraugus County, New York. The district encompasses the historic core of the village of Ellicottville with structures associated with the civic, commercial, religious, educational, and residential life of the village between 1817 and 1935. The structures reflect a variety of 19th-century and early 20th-century architectural styles including Queen Anne, Federal, and Greek Revival styles. The district contains 63 contributing and 3 non-contributing structures. Located within the district is the Ellicottville Town Hall.

It was listed on the National Register of Historic Places in 1991.

References

External links
Ellicottville Chamber of Commerce website

Historic districts on the National Register of Historic Places in New York (state)
Greek Revival architecture in New York (state)
Queen Anne architecture in New York (state)
Federal architecture in New York (state)
Historic districts in Cattaraugus County, New York
National Register of Historic Places in Cattaraugus County, New York